The Petre Andrei University of Iași is a private university in Iași, Romania, founded in 1990. It was named in honor of the Romanian philosopher Petre Andrei.

In September 2013, Petre Andrei University absorbed Gheorghe Zane University.

Structure
Faculties
 Faculty of Law
 Faculty of Economics
 Faculty of Psychology and Educational Sciences
 Faculty of Social Work and Sociology
 Faculty of Political and Administrative Sciences

References

External links

 Official site

Andrei
Educational institutions established in 1990
1990 establishments in Romania